The Crimson Armada was an American metalcore band formed in Westerville, Ohio in 2007 by Kyle Barrington and David Puckett. Following a one-year hiatus in 2008, the band returned to increased popularity, releasing its first EP, Behold the Architect. Following the release of Behold the Architect, the Crimson Armada signed a record deal with Metal Blade Records. In July 2009, the band released its debut album,  Guardians. Following the album's release, the band went on several tours with acts such as the Chariot, and MyChildren MyBride. In mid-2010 the group headed out on the Scream the Prayer Tour.

In January 2011, Crimson Armada signed a record deal with Artery Recordings, and announced Conviction, which was released June 21, 2011. Conviction contained guest vocalist contributions by Andy Adkins of A Plea for Purging and Levi Benton of Miss May I. That April, the band performed at the 13th annual New England Metal and Hardcore Festival. In February 2012, Brandon McMaster left the band and was replaced by Cye Marshall. On October 29, 2012, the band announced that they would be disbanding due to their lead vocalist, Saud Ahmed, leaving the band.

Band members

Final lineup
 Saud Ahmed – lead vocals (2008–2012) , keyboards, programming (2007–2012)
 Dan Hatfield – rhythm guitar, backing vocals (2007–2012)
 Jordan Matz – drums (2011-2012)
 Cye Marshall – lead guitar (2012)
 Michael Cooper – bass (2012)

Former members
 Colin Casto – lead vocals (2007–2008)
 Scott Ulliman – bass (2007–2008)
 Kyle Barrington – lead guitar (2007–2009)
 Josh Jardim – lead guitar (2009–2011)
 Chris Yates – bass, backing vocals (2008–2010)
 David Puckett – drums (2007–2011, played in For Today, now plays in We Came as Romans)
 Kevin Lankford – bass (2011–2012)
 Brandon McMaster – lead guitar, clean vocals (2010–2012) 

Timeline

Discography
Albums
 Guardians (Metal Blade Records, 2009)
 Conviction  (Artery Recordings, 2011)
EPs
 Behold the Architect (self-released, 2008)
 Demo 2010 (self-released, 2010)

Videography
 "The Serpent's Tongue"
 "Forgive Me"

References

External links
Metal Blade Records Page

Heavy metal musical groups from Ohio
Metalcore musical groups from Ohio
American deathcore musical groups
Musical groups from Columbus, Ohio
Musical groups established in 2007
Musical groups disestablished in 2012